Best Practice & Research: Clinical Rheumatology is a medical journal covering evidence-based medicine as applied to clinical practice of musculoskeletal conditions. It is aimed at clinical physicians and trainees, to help them keep up to date with current practice. Issues contain review articles with a practical bent.

Publication history
 Clinics in Rheumatic Diseases , published from 1975 to 1986 by W. B. Saunders, split into:
Baillière's Clinical Rheumatology , published from 1987 to 1998
Rheumatic Disease Clinics of North America
Baillière's Best Practice & Research. Clinical Rheumatology, published 1999 to 2000 by Baillière Tindall

References 

Rheumatology journals
Publications established in 1987
Bimonthly journals